The  Asian Men's Volleyball Championship was the fourteenth staging of the Asian Men's Volleyball Championship, a biennial international volleyball tournament organised by the Asian Volleyball Confederation (AVC) with Indonesian Volleyball Federation (PBVSI). The tournament was held in Jakarta, Indonesia from 31 August to 9 September 2007.

Venues

Pools composition
The teams are seeded based on their final ranking at the 2005 Asian Men's Volleyball Championship.

Preliminary round

Pool A

|}

|}

Pool B

|}

|}

Pool C

|}

|}

Pool D

|}

|}

Classification round
 The results and the points of the matches between the same teams that were already played during the preliminary round shall be taken into account for the classification round.

Pool E

|}

|}

Pool F

|}

|}

Pool G

|}

|}

Pool H

|}

|}

Final round 
 The results and the points of the matches between the same teams that were already played during the previous rounds shall be taken into account for the final round.

Classification 13th–16th

|}

|}

Classification 9th–12th 

|}

|}

Championship

|}

|}

Final standing

Awards
MVP:  Dan Howard
Best Scorer:  Mohammad Mohammadkazem
Best Spiker:  Lee Kyung-soo
Best Blocker:  Lee Sun-kyu
Best Server:  Yu Koshikawa
Best Setter:  Kosuke Tomonaga
Best Libero:  Yeo Oh-hyun
Best Receiver:  Siriphum Supachai

References
Asian Volleyball Confederation
Results
Official Report

V
A
Asian men's volleyball championships
V